Guangxiao Temple is a Buddhist temple located in Chengxiang District of Putian, Fujian, China. It has been burned down and rebuilt a number of times, due to the natural disasters and wars. The present version was completed in the 1980s. Alongside Guanghua Temple, Guishan Temple and Nangshan Temple, it is hailed as one of the "Four Famous Buddhist Temples in Puyang".

History

Sui dynasty
The temple traces its origins to the former Guanyin Pavilion, founded in the Sui dynasty (589–618).

Song dynasty
In 1085, in the 8th year of Yuanfeng era (1078–1085) of the Song dynasty (960–1279), Li Pangu, a landlord of Mount Mei, donated more than 100 mu lands to establish a Buddhist temple when he got a son after worshiping Guanyin.

In 1103, in the 2nd year of Chongning (1102–1106), Emperor Huizong inscribed a plaque with Chinese characters "Buddhist State in Meilin" to the temple. In the following year, he renamed the temple "Chongning Chan Temple". In 1111, in the 1st year of Zhenghe period (1111–1118), Emperor Huizong changed it name into "Tianning Wanshou Temple". The temple was renovated and redecorated by abbot Huizhao.

In 1137, in the 7th year of Shaoxing period (1131–1162), Emperor Gaozong honored the name "Bao'en Guangxiao Temple", more commonly known as "Guangxiao Temple", this name has been used to date. Eighteen years later, abbot Huaixiu asked ironworker Cai Tong to cast a bronze bell. When the bell rings, the toll can be heard very far away.

Ming dynasty
In 1408, in the 6th year of Yongle era (1402–1424) of the Ming dynasty (1368–1644), abbot Guiyong restored the temple.

In 1562, in the reign of Jiajing Emperor (1522–1566), the Japanese pirates set a fire to demolish the temple. Most of its buildings were burned down, only the Mahavira Hall and Drum tower survived.

In 1578, in the 6th year of Wanli period (1573–1620), abbot Yuezhen rebuilt the temple, KKitchen, Dharma Hall, Shanmen, Hall of Sangharama Palace and Zhanbai Pavilion were gradually added to the temple.

Qing dynasty
During the Qing dynasty (1644–1911), Guangxiao Temple underwent three renovations, respectively in the ruling of Shunzhi Emperor (1644–1661) and in the reign of Kangxi Emperor (1662–1722) and in the Yongzheng era (1723–1735).

In 1887, in the 13th year of Guangxu period (1875–1908), the Song dynasty bronze bell was melted down while the Bell tower caught fire and in ruins. Twelve years later, Weijia was proposed as the new abbot of Guangxiao Temple. He raised funds to restore the Mahavira Hall, Abbot's Room, Reception Hall, Bell tower, Drum tower, Hall of Skanda and Meditation Hall. And a new bell was cast. Outside the bell engraved 543 words of Nīlakaṇṭha Dhāraṇī and Bell Mantra.

People's Republic of China
After the establishment of the Communist State, the Fujian Provincial Government provided great protection for Guangxiao Temple.

In 1966, Mao Zedong launched the Cultural Revolution, Guangxiao Temple was completely destroyed by the Red Guards with only the Qing dynasty bell remaining.

After the 3rd Plenary Session of the 11th Central Committee of the Chinese Communist Party, according to the national policy of free religious belief, Guangxiao Temple was officially reopened to the public. A modern restoration of the entire temple complex was carried out in 1980 and lasted ten years.  Guangxiao Temple has been designated as a National Key Buddhist Temple in Han Chinese Area by the State Council of China in 1983.

Architecture

Guangxiao Temple is built along the up and down of mountains and divided into the central, east and west routes. Along the central axis are the Shanmen, Four Heavenly Kings Hall, Zhanbai Pavilion, Mahavira Hall, Dharma Hall and Great Compassion Hall. There are over ten halls and rooms on both sides, including Guru Hall, Abbot's Hall, Monastic Dining Hall, Monastic Reception Hall, Bell tower, Drum tower and Meditation Hall.

Great Compassion Hall

References

Buddhist temples in Putian
Buildings and structures in Putian
Tourist attractions in Putian
20th-century establishments in China
20th-century Buddhist temples
Religious buildings and structures completed in the 1980s